Norway participated in the Eurovision Song Contest 2009 with the song "Fairytale" written and performed by Alexander Rybak. NRK organised the national final Melodi Grand Prix 2009 in order to select the Norwegian entry for the 2009 contest in Moscow, Russia. "Fairytale" performed by Alexander Rybak was selected as the winner with the clearest victory in Melodi Grand Prix to date following a five-week-long competition consisting of three semi-finals, a Last Chance round and the final.

Norway was drawn to compete in the second semi-final of the Eurovision Song Contest which took place on 14 May 2009. Performing during the show in position 6, "Fairytale" was announced among the top 10 entries of the second semi-final and therefore qualified to compete in the final on 16 May. It was later revealed that Norway placed first out of the 19 participating countries in the semi-final with 201 points. In the final, Norway performed in position 20 and placed first out of the 25 participating countries, winning the contest with 387 points. This was Norway's third win in the Eurovision Song Contest since 1995.

Background

Prior to the 2009 contest, Norway had participated in the Eurovision Song Contest forty-seven times since its first entry in 1960. Norway had won the contest on two occasions: in 1985 with the song "La det swinge" performed by Bobbysocks! and in 1995 with the song "Nocturne" performed by Secret Garden. Norway also had the two dubious distinctions of having finished last in the Eurovision final more than any other country and for having the most "nul points" (zero points) in the contest, the latter being a record the nation shared together with Austria. The country had finished last eleven times and had failed to score a point during four contests. Following the introduction of semi-finals for the 2004, Norway has finished in the top ten two times, including their 2008 entry "Hold On Be Strong" performed by Maria Haukaas Storeng.

The Norwegian national broadcaster, Norsk rikskringkasting (NRK), broadcasts the event within Norway and organises the selection process for the nation's entry. NRK confirmed their intentions to participate at the 2009 Eurovision Song Contest on 9 June 2008. The broadcaster has traditionally organised the national final Melodi Grand Prix, which has selected the Norwegian entry for the Eurovision Song Contest in all but one of their participation. On the same day, the broadcaster revealed details regarding their selection procedure and announced the organization of Melodi Grand Prix 2009 in order to select the 2009 Norwegian entry.

Before Eurovision

Melodi Grand Prix 2009 
Melodi Grand Prix 2009 was the 47th edition of the Norwegian national final Melodi Grand Prix and selected Norway's entry for the Eurovision Song Contest 2009. The competition consisted of three semi-finals, a Last Chance round and a final in different cities across Norway, hosted by Maria Haukaas Storeng and Per Sundnes. The shows were televised on NRK1 as well as streamed online at NRK's official website nrk.no. The final was also broadcast online at the official Eurovision Song Contest website eurovision.tv.

Format
The competition consisted of five shows: three semi-finals on 24 January, 31 January and 7 February 2009, the Last Chance (Siste Sjansen) round on 14 February 2009 and a final on 21 February 2009. Seven songs competed in each semi-final and the top two entries proceeded directly to the final, while the songs that placed third and fourth proceeded to the Last Chance round. The fifth-placed act from the semi-finals with the most votes and the entry selected by online voting at VG's official website between 7 and 9 February 2009 also proceeded to the Last Chance round as wildcards. An additional two entries qualified from the Last Chance round to the final. The results in the semi-finals and Last Chance round were determined exclusively by public televoting. The results in the final were determined by public televoting and four regional juries.

Competing entries 
A submission period was opened by NRK between 9 June 2008 and 1 September 2008. Songwriters were required to hold Norwegian citizenship or have permanent residency in Norway. Collaborations with foreign songwriters were permitted as long as half of the composition were by Norwegian songwriters. NRK also reserved the right to choose the performers of the selected songs in consultation with the songwriters and directly invite certain artists and composers to compete in addition to the public call for submissions. At the close of the deadline, over 350 submissions were received – 600 less than the previous year. Eighteen songs were intended to be selected for the competition by a jury panel, however twenty-one songs were ultimately selected due to the high quality of submissions. Eleven of the competing songs were revealed on 10 December 2008, while the remaining songs were revealed on 17 December 2008. The competing artists in each semi-final were revealed on 22 December 2008, 29 December 2008 and 5 January 2009, respectively.

Semi-final 1 
Seven songs competed during the first semi-final on 24 January 2009 at the Kongsvinger Hall in Kongsvinger. "Det vart en storm" performed by Thomas Brøndbo and "Tricky" performed by Velvet qualified directly to the final, while "U Look Good" performed by Surferosa and "Two of a Kind" performed by Espen Hana proceeded to the Last Chance round. On 9 February 2009, "Party" performed by KeSera feat. Anita Hegerland was revealed as the fifth-placed entry with the most votes and proceeded to the Last Chance round as a wildcard.

Semi-final 2 

Seven songs competed during the second semi-final on 31 January 2009 at the Bodø Spektrum in Bodø. "Find My Girl" performed by Alexander Stenerud and "Butterflies" performed by Tone Damli Aaberge qualified directly to the final, while "Te stein" performed by Publiners and "(Like You Did) Yesterday" performed by Janni Santillan proceeded to the Last Chance round.

Semi-final 3 
Seven songs competed during the third semi-final on 7 February 2009 at the Skien Fritidspark in Skien. "Seven Seconds" performed by Ovi and "Fairytale" performed by Alexander Rybak qualified directly to the final, while "Shuffled" performed by Jane Helen and "Carrie" performed by Sunny proceeded to the Last Chance round. On 9 February 2009, "Do It Again" performed by Foxy was selected by the VG online vote to proceed to the Last Chance round as a wildcard.

Last Chance round
The Last Chance (Siste sjansen) round took place on 14 February 2009 at the Sunnmørshallen in Ålesund. The six entries that placed third and fourth in the preceding four semi-finals alongside the two wildcards competed and the results were determined over two rounds of voting. In the first round, the eight entries competed in four duels and the winners of each duel were selected to proceed to the second round: "Two of a Kind" performed by Espen Hana, "U Look Good" performed by Surferosa, "Te stein" performed by Publiners and "Shuffled" performed by Jane Helen. In the second round, the four entries competed in two duels and the winners of each duel, "Two of a Kind" performed by Espen Hana and "Te stein" performed by Publiners, proceeded to the final.

Final
Eight songs consisting of the six semi-final qualifiers alongside two qualifiers from the Second Chance round competed during the final on 21 February 2009 at the Oslo Spektrum in Oslo. Before the final, the group Velvet changed their name to Velvet Inc. in order to avoid confusion with Swedish singer Velvet who was competing in 2009 Swedish national selection Melodifestivalen 2009. The winner was selected over two rounds of voting. In the first round, the top four entries were selected by public televoting to proceed to the second round, the Gold Final: "Te stein" performed by Publiners, "Find My Girl" performed by Alexander Stenerud, "Fairytale" performed by Alexander Rybak and "Butterflies" performed by Tone Damli Aaberge. In the Gold Final, four regional juries from the four semi-final and Second Chance round host cities awarded 2,000, 4,000, 6,000 and 8,000 points to their top four songs. The results of the public televote were revealed by Norway's five regions and added to the jury scores, leading to the victory of "Fairytale" performed by Alexander Rybak with 747,888 votes, over 600,000 more than runner-up "Butterflies" performed by Tone Damli Aaberge which is the clearest victory in Melodi Grand Prix to date. In addition to the performances of the competing entries, the interval act featured a performance by the show host Maria Haukaas Storeng.

Promotion
Rybak made several appearances at events after his win at Melodi Grand Prix. Before winning the contest Rybak charted in the Norwegian singles chart, VG-lista, at number 1 with "Fairytale". This was the first time in MGP history that the winner reached the top of the charts before winning the contest. After, and even before, his win at Melodi Grand prix Rybak also became one of the hottest favourites to win the contest in Moscow in May.

On 14 March NRK released an official video-clip of "Fairytale", showing Rybak's performance at MGP. Rybak's overwhelming victory at MGP spread "Eurovision fever" throughout Norway over their perceived odds on winning Eurovision in Moscow.

In April Rybak joined four-time Eurovision contestant Elisabeth Andreassen at a contest in the Oslo Concert Hall. Although his appearance was agreed upon before MGP, his win at the contest most likely promoted his appearance at Eurovision. Alongside a group performance, Rybak also performed a solo number, "Song from a Secret Garden", a cover of Eurovision winners Secret Garden.

Approaching the contest, foreign media began focusing on Rybak and his song. It was reported that "Fairytale" had been played Greek television, and in April a crew from Russian TV channel NTV travelled to Oslo to record a documentary on Rybak, which was featured to over 18 million people in Russia. It was also reported that there was a lot of media attention in Russian magazines and newspapers on Rybak. Further media attention on Rybak was made across the ocean, in the United States. A report on The Oprah Winfrey Show contained Rybak, along with one half of the German entry Oscar Loya, on a report on The World's Got Talent. The report also included Britain's Got Talent contestant Susan Boyle, as well as The X Factor, American Idol, and both Britain's and America's Got Talent judge and record producer Simon Cowell.

At Eurovision

Alexander Rybak represented Norway in the Eurovision Song Contest 2009 finals in Moscow with the song "Fairytale" after getting through the semi-finals. Since Norway was not one of the "Big Four" and was not the host of the 2009 contest, it was required to compete in the second semi-final on 14 May 2009. Alexander Rybak performed for Norway sixth in the running order, following Poland and preceding Cyprus, and secured a spot in the final on 16 May 2009. He performed 20th in the running order, following Albania and preceding Ukraine. Rybak won by a significant margin, scoring 387 points, 169 points over second placed Yohanna, representing Iceland.

Having got at least 2 points from all 41 countries, Norway scored the highest number of points for any entry in any Eurovision Song Contest at the time. They received 12 points from 16 countries. This record was broken by Sweden in 2012 when they received 12 points from 18 countries. Had the current scoring system introduced in 2016 already been in use in 2009, Norway would have scored 690 points. That has only been surpassed by Portugal in 2017 who got 758 points.

The Norwegian commentator for NRK was Synnøve Svabø. In the aftermath of the show, she was criticized for chattering while the Russian hosts were speaking, and for some vulgar comments. During the coverage of the voting, Svabø was heard on live television making phone calls to Rolf Løvland, Elisabeth Andreassen, Hanne Krogh, Trond Giske, Hans Bjerkås and Jens Stoltenberg. Several viewers reported that they had switched to the Swedish coverage on SVT1.

The Norwegian points to other countries were determined entirely by jury due to a technical fault. Telenor promised to refund the cost of the vote to the Norwegian voters, which totalled 1.36 million Norwegian krone.

Voting

Points awarded to Norway

Points awarded by Norway

Detailed voting results
The Norwegian televoting results were released by the EBU in July 2009, however these were not able to be incorporated in the Norwegian points given during the contest. The below table outlines how the Norwegian points would have been calculated had the televoting results been ready. With these combined points, although the overall winner of the contest would not have changed, Bosnia and Herzegovina would have achieved 8th place instead of France, Denmark would have achieved 12th place instead of Ukraine, and Sweden would have achieved 20th place instead of Germany.

References

External links
Full national final on nrk.no

2009
Countries in the Eurovision Song Contest 2009
2009
Eurovision
Eurovision